The 1931 World Fencing Championships were held in Vienna, Austria.

Medal summary

Men's events

Women's events

References

World Fencing Championships
1931 in Austria
1930s in Vienna
Sports competitions in Vienna
International fencing competitions hosted by Austria